Rein Kikerpill (born 21 October 1962 Tallinn) is an Estonian journalist and politician. He was a member of VII Riigikogu.

References

Living people
1962 births
Members of the Riigikogu, 1992–1995
Politicians from Tallinn